Zayanes ( (singular),  (plural)) are a Berber population inhabiting the Khenifra region, located in the central Middle Atlas mountains of Morocco.

Zayanes tribes are known for their attachment to ancestral land and for their tenacity as warriors, especially during the colonization, led by Mouha ou Hammou Zayani. Thus they have prevented many invaders from easily seizing Khénifra. Despite the French defeat in the Battle of El Herri, 13 November 1914, the colonizers were determined not to abandon the fight against the Zayanes, but concerned French troops in invading Morocco in coming face to face with the Zayanes.

Geography
The tribes of Zayanes live in the Middle Atlas mountain range in the area of Khénifra. The Zayanes belong to a large tribe that twice a year wanders toward , where the climate is milder in contrast to Adrar where the winter is very severe.

The Zayanes speak Central Atlas Tamazight (Tazayit), which is one of the Berber languages.

The Zayanes enjoy goat's and ewe's milk as well as Ahriche. The latter is a dish of tripe, usually consisting of ganglion, caul, lung or heart of an animal wound with intestines on a stick of oak and cooked on hot coals.

References

General references
F Berger, Mouha ou Hammou Azaii
Abes, M, Les izayanes d'Oulmès, Archives Berbères, 1915.
Amarir, O, La poésie marocaine amazighe, 1975.
Aspignon, R, Etude sur les coutumes des tribus zayanes, éd. Moynier,1946, Casa.
Basset, André, La littérature Berbère, La Pléiade, 1955.
Ben Daoud, O i, Notes sur le pays zayan, archives berbères, 1917.
Berger, F, Moha Ouhammou le zayani, éd. Atlas, 1929.
Bernie, G, Moha Ohammou, guerrier berbère, éd. Gautey, Casa, 1945.
Chafik, Mohamed, Trente trois siècle de l'histoire des imazighen, Boukili éd. 2000 (3e éd.).
Chafik, Mohamed, La poésie amazighe et la résistance armée dans le Moyen Atlas et l'Est du Haut Atlas, revue de l'Académie du Royaume, no4, 1987.
Camps, Gabriel, Berbères aux marges de l'histoire, éd. Espérides, 1980.
Guennoun, S, La montagne berbère, ou les Ait Oumalou, éd. Oumnia, Rabat, 1933.
Guennoun, S, La voix des monts, Mœurs de guerres berbères, éd. Oumnia, Rabat, 1934.
Guillaume, A, (Général), Les berbères marocains et la pacification de l'Atlas Central (1912–1933), Julliard, 1946

Berber peoples and tribes
Berbers in Morocco
Moroccan tribes